Black Tickle Airport  is  northwest of Black Tickle, Newfoundland and Labrador, Canada.

References

External links
Black Tickle Airport on COPA's Places to Fly airport directory

Certified airports in Newfoundland and Labrador